Vinod Kumar Bind is an Indian politician, doctor, and member of the NISHAD Party. He is a member of the 18th Legislative Assembly of Uttar Pradesh, representing the Majhawan Assembly constituency of Uttar Pradesh, India.

Early life 

Vinod Kumar Bind was born in 1974 in Uttar Pradesh to the family of Sachanu Ram. He completed his Bachelor of Medicine and Bachelor of Surgery from Allahabad University.

Posts held

See also 

 18th Uttar Pradesh Assembly
 Majhawan Assembly constituency
 Uttar Pradesh Legislative Assembly

References 

1974 births
Living people
People from Uttar Pradesh
Indian political people
Uttar Pradesh MLAs 2022–2027
Indian politicians
NISHAD Party politicians